Gadsden High School (GHS), originally named Valley High School, is a public high school in unincorporated Doña Ana County, New Mexico, United States, with an Anthony postal address. Gadsden High School is administered by Gadsden Independent School District. 

Gadsden High School serves the surrounding towns of Mesquite, Vado, Berino, La Mesa, San Miguel, Chamberino, La Union, and Anthony.

Namesake 
The school's name is in reference to the land acquisition known as the Gadsden Purchase.

Athletics
GHS competes in the New Mexico Activities Association (NMAA), as a class 6A school in District 3. 
State championships in football: 1953, 1954, 1955, 1961, 1962. (https://www.nmact.org/file/Football_Past_Champs.pdf)
State championships in volleyball: 2010, 2011 (https://www.nmact.org/file/Volleyball_Champions.pdf)

References

Public high schools in New Mexico
Schools in Doña Ana County, New Mexico
1928 establishments in New Mexico
Educational institutions established in 1928